The Type 63 multiple rocket launcher is a towed, 12-tube, 107mm rocket launcher produced by the People's Republic of China in the early 1960s and later exported and manufactured globally. Although no longer serving with active infantry units, the Type 63 is still in People's Liberation Army service with specialized formations such as mountain infantry units and special forces detachments. The Type 63 was widely used in the PLA until the late 1980s. It was adopted as the successor of the Type 50-5 of 102mm.

China has also developed a Type 63 multiple rocket launcher of 130mm. The RPU-14 is a Soviet 140mm MRL of similar design to the Type 63.

Description

The launcher's 12 tubes are arranged in three removable rows of four each, mounted on a single-axle carriage with rubber tires. The Type 63 originally fired an 18.8 kilogram rocket (Type 63-2) with a 1.3 kilogram warhead. Ammunition for the Type 63 was later improved (Type 75 and Type 81 series), although the overall weight of the rocket remained the same. A fixed amount of propellant is contained in the rocket motor. The steel-cased rocket is stabilized with spin imparted by six angled nozzles in its base. Type 63 rockets may be launched without the launcher; improvised firing can employ tubing, rails or even dirt berms. The Type 63 was distributed on the basis of six per infantry regiment, or 18 per infantry division. For airborne and mountain units the lighter Type 63-I was developed.

Both the Type 63 and its copies can be mounted on different kinds of armoured and unarmoured vehicles, for example the MT-LB, the Safir, the Mamba, the RG-32 Scout, the GAZ-66 and the M113.

Licence versions
The Type 63 and its rockets are license-built in several countries including:
 Sudan – Taka.
 Iran – Fajr-1 of D.I.O. with Haseb-1 rocket.
 South Africa – RO 107 of Mechem Developments.
 North Korea – Type 75.
 North Vietnam, Vietnam – H-12.
 Turkey – T-107 of MKEK with rockets TR-107 "Anadolu" and TRB-107.
 Egypt – RL812/TLC of the Helwan Machinery and Equipment Factory (Factory 999).

BM-12 nomenclature issue
NATO and western sources have used the Soviet-style designation BM-12 to describe this weapon system, and further even ascribe Soviet origin and initial manufacture of both launcher and rockets. However, there is no evidence in non-western sources of Soviet development or production, or of the BM-12 moniker being applied. Very similar Type 50-5 or Type 488 102mm rockets were manufactured in China and used in the Korean War prior to development of the Type 63.

It appears the systems designated BM-12 (for example in Afghanistan and Libya) were or are all of Chinese origin, being merely used or cross-traded by Soviet interests.

Variants

Multiple rocket launchers
 The Chinese Type 81 SPMRL 107mm is a self-propelled export version, based on the Nanjing NJ-230 truck.
 North Korea has developed versions with 18 and 24 launch tubes that are mounted on vehicles such as the tracked VTT-323 or the wheeled M1992.
 ROKETSAN of Turkey has designed an improved 107mm multiple rocket launch system, consisting of a HMMWV with two 12-round launch modules and a fire control system. The system uses the TR-107 and TRB-107 rockets but the range has been increased to 11 km.
T-107M, Vehicle Mounted, 12 Steel Tube MBRL
T-107SPM, Vehicle-mounted 2 × 12 Tubes Disposable MBRL with Insulated Pod
T-107/122, Vehicle Mounted 3 × 20 Tubes Disposable MBRL with Insulated Pod

Single-tube rocket launchers
A number of countries have developed single-tube, man-portable rocket launchers that fire the same type of rockets:
 China: Type 85 with an empty weight of 22.5 kg.
 Egypt: PRL-81, similar to the Type 85 system.
 South Africa: Inflict of Mechem Developments with an empty weight of 26 kg.
 Iran: Karkhe, Single shot disposable launcher.

Operators

Current operators

 
  – 270.
 
  – ~4 
  – former user
 
 
 
  – 12 
 
  – 25
 Tigray Defense Forces
  - 25 
  – ~3 
 
  – 1,300 as of 2020
  Liwa Fatemiyoun
 
 
  Popular Mobilization Forces
 
 
 
  Syrian Social Nationalist Party (SSNP)
  Hezbollah
 
  – 4 
  – retired
  – 30 
  – 33 
  – Type-81 variant in service 
  Palestine Liberation Organisation
  People's Defense Units (YPG)
  – (Launchers captured in Angola, rockets manufactured locally)
 
  – 477 
 
  – Manufactured locally as TR-107.
 : 171
 – Fielded during the Vietnam War. 360 
  – 16

Former operators
 
  Lebanese Forces
  People's Liberation Army
  Amal Movement
 Liberation Tigers of Tamil Eelam: 2

See also
 T-122 Sakarya
 Fajr-5

Notes

References
 (JAA) Jane's Armour and Artillery 1981–82, Christopher Foss (ed.), London: Jane's Publishing Company Ltd., 1981.  .

External links

 OrData report on 107-mm rocket projectile
 GlobalSecurity on the Type 63 and Type 81
 Mao's Rockets and the Eastern Afghan Border War, Part I Part II Part III, article series about the use of Type 63 rockets in Afghanistan.

Artillery of the People's Republic of China
Rocket artillery
Multiple rocket launchers
Military equipment introduced in the 1960s